Comin' and Goin' is the second album led by Native American saxophonist and composer Jim Pepper recorded in 1983 and first released on the French Europa label. The album was reissued on Antilles in 1987.

Reception

Allmusic awarded the album 4½ stars with its review by Michael G. Nastos stating, "Of the limited discography offered to us by Jim Pepper, this is his finest contemporary recording... Pepper creates world jazz fusion with a twist relating to his heritage, something that perhaps nobody else has done, or is capable of" and calling it an "inspired and inspirational set, which is highly recommended".<ref name="Allmusic">{{AllMusic|first=Michael G. |last=Nastos |class=album |id=mw0000649682 |title=Comin' and Goin''' – Review |accessdate=November 12, 2015}}</ref>

 Track listing All compositions by Jim Pepper except as indicated''
 "Witchi-Tai-To" – 8:19
 "Ya Na Ho" (Gilbert Pepper) – 3:00
 "Squaw Song" (Gilbert Pepper) – 5:24
 "Goin' Down to Muskogee" – 5:50
 "Comin' and Goin'" – 4:41
 "Lakota Song" (Traditional) – 4:23
 "Water" – 5:40
 "Custer Gets It" – 3:02
 "Malinyea" (Don Cherry) – 4:15

Personnel 
Jim Pepper – tenor saxophone, soprano saxophone, vocals
Nana Vasconcelos – percussion, vocals
Don Cherry – trumpet (tracks 3 & 9)
Kenny Werner – piano (tracks 1, 3–5 & 7–9)
Bill Frisell (track 6), John Scofield (tracks 1, 4, 5 & 8) – guitar 
Mark Helias (tracks 3, 7 & 9), Ed Schuller (track 6) – bass 
Lester McFarland – electric bass, vocals (tracks 1, 4, 5 & 8)
Colin Walcott – tabla, sitar (tracks 2, 3, 7 & 9)
Danny Gottlieb – drums, vocals (tracks 3, 7 & 9)
Hamid Drake – percussion, vocals
Jane Lind, Caren Knight – vocals (track 6)

References 

Jim Pepper albums
1983 albums
Antilles Records albums